Horace Arthur Speed III (born October 4, 1951) is a retired Major League Baseball outfielder who played three seasons for the San Francisco Giants and the Cleveland Indians.

Speed was selected by the Giants in the 3rd round of the 1969 MLB Draft. He made his major league debut with San Francisco as a pinch runner for catcher Dave Rader in 1975, as the Giants defeated the San Diego Padres, 2–0. He then signed as a free agent with the Indians on December 7, 1977, and had his most productive major league season with the team in 1978, appearing in 70 games.

Speed made his final major league appearance in 1979, as a pinch runner for Cliff Johnson, in a Cleveland 4-3 loss to the Baltimore Orioles.

References

External links
, or Retrosheet, or Pura Pelota (Venezuelan Winter League)

1951 births
Living people
African-American baseball players
Amarillo Giants players
Arizona Instructional League Giants players
Baseball players from Los Angeles
Cardenales de Lara players
Cleveland Indians players
Decatur Commodores players
Fresno Giants players
Great Falls Giants players
Major League Baseball outfielders
Navegantes del Magallanes players
American expatriate baseball players in Venezuela
Phoenix Giants players
Richmond Braves players
San Francisco Giants players
Savannah Braves players
Tacoma Tugs players
21st-century African-American people
20th-century African-American sportspeople